Patrick Stokes may refer to:

 Patrick Stokes (businessman) (born 1942), American businessman
 Paddy Stokes (1884–1945), Australian politician
 Patrick Stokes (philosopher), Australian philosopher